The Parliament of the Republic of Kazakhstan of the 6th convocation was the legislative term of the Parliament of Kazakhstan.

The convocation was formed shortly after the 2016 Kazakh legislative election where 98 members of the Mazhilis were elected based on the party list through proportional representation, while the 9 seats are reserved to the indirectly elected members of the Assembly of People. The legislative term of the Mazhilis ended on 30 December 2020 while the meeting of the members of the Senate of Kazakhstan continued until 14 January 2021.

6th Mazhilis

Structure

Members

6th Senate 
The powers of the Senate of the Parliament of the Republic of Kazakhstan of the 6th convocation began with the opening of its first session on 25 March 2016 and continued until 14 January 2021.

In the 6th Senate, the powers of the Senators elected in 2011 and 2014, appointed by the President of the Republic of Kazakhstan Nursultan Nazarbayev in 2011 and 2013, in accordance with constitutional norms, were continued.

On 28 June 2017, elections of Senators were held in accordance with the decree of the President of the Republic of Kazakhstan. The powers of the Senate members elected in 2011 were terminated due to the registration of the members elected in 2017.

In June 2018, the city of Shymkent became a city of republican significance, in connection with which, in October 2018, elections of Senators from the new administrative unit were held.

On 20 March 2019, Kassym-Jomart Tokayev's seat became vacant after he became the President of Kazakhstan following Nazarbayev's resignation. Before stepping down, Nazarbayev signed decree, replacing Tokayev with Senator Qairat Qojamjarov while his eldest daughter Dariga Nazarbayeva was elected as the Senate Chair.

On 12 August 2019, 6 new Senators were appointed by Tokayev, and two more Senators extended their powers.

Elections of Senate members were held on 12 August 2020 in accordance with the decree of the President of the Republic of Kazakhstan. The powers of the Senators elected in 2014 were terminated due to the registration of the members elected in 2017.

Structure

Senators

References 

Convocations of the Mazhilis